The Boys' Singles tournament of the 2006 BWF World Junior Championships is a badminton world junior individual championships for the Eye Level Cups, held on November 6–11. The defending champion of the last edition is Chen Jin from China. The host player Hong Ji-hoon won the gold medal in this event after beat Tommy Sugiarto of Indonesia in the rubber game with the score 21–13, 10–21, 21–16.

Seeded 

Kenichi Tago (quarter-final)
Han Ki-Hoon (quarter-final)
Mohd Arif Abdul Latif (fourth round)
Tommy Sugiarto (final)
Chen Tianyu (third round)
Lu Qicheng (semi-final)
Teo Kok Siang (third round)
Derek Wong Zi Liang (fourth round)
Mads Conrad-Petersen (fourth round)
Hong Ji-Hoon (champion)
Wen Kai (second round)
Lim Fang Yang (fourth round)
Naohiro Matsukawa (quarter-final)
Lester Oey (second round)
Jeff Tho (third round)
Wong Shu Ki (second round)

Draw

Finals

Top half

Section 1

Section 2

Section 3

Section 4

Bottom half

Section 5

Section 6

Section 7

Section 8

References

External links 
 Tournament Draw at www.koreabadminton.org

2006 BWF World Junior Championships
2006 in youth sport